Cobcrephora is a genus of that resembles the Palaeoloricates, known from the Silurian of Gotland.  Its interpretation as a polyplacophoran is widely challenged.

Its mollusc shell is unique, because Cobcrephora was described on the basis of isolated phosphatic sclerites.  Its overlapping sclerites are arched and small, comprise two shell layers, and have lamellar projections.

References

Silurian animals
Prehistoric chiton genera